The 2020 SHISEIDO Cup of China was the third event in the 2020–21 ISU Grand Prix of Figure Skating, a senior-level international invitational competition series. It was held at the Chongqing Huaxi Culture and Sports Center in Chongqing, China on November 6–8. Medals were awarded in the disciplines of men's singles, ladies' singles, pair skating, and ice dance.

Due to the ongoing COVID-19 pandemic, a large number of modifications were made to the Grand Prix structure. The competitors consisted only of skaters from the home country, skaters already training in the host nation, and skaters assigned to that event for geographic reasons. The Chinese Skating Association was the only federation to host a wholly domestic Grand Prix event.

On July 9, 2020, the General Administration of Sport of China announced that no international sporting events would be held in China in 2020, except for 2022 Winter Olympics test events. The ISU announced on July 13 that the Cup of China would be held as scheduled in Chongqing, due to its connection to the Beijing test event, the Grand Prix Final (later cancelled). On October 29, 2020, the Chinese Skating Association announced that the event would be held with no audience present for health reasons.

Entries 
The International Skating Union announced the preliminary assignments on October 1, 2020.

Changes to preliminary assignments

Results

Men

Ladies

Pairs

Ice dance

References 

2020 Cup of China
2020 in figure skating
2020 in Chinese sport
November 2020 sports events in China